Ciocchi is an Italian surname. Notable people with the surname include:

Giovanni Maria Ciocchi (1658–1725), Italian painter and art critic
Ulisse Ciocchi (1570–1631), Italian painter

See also
Ciocci
Ciocchi Del Monte

Italian-language surnames